The 14 cm/50 3rd Year Type naval gun was a Japanese low-angle weapon introduced during World War I.

History
It served as the secondary armament in a number of Japanese dreadnoughts and as the main armament in light cruisers and some auxiliary ships. It was also the most common Japanese coast-defense gun during World War II.  "Third year type" refers to the Welin breech block on this gun. Breech-block design began in 1914, the third year of the Taishō period.  This breech-block design was also used on Japanese 40 cm (16 inch), 20 cm (8 inch), 15.5 cm (6 inch), 12.7 cm (5 inch), and 12 cm (4.7 inch) naval guns.

This gun was not mounted aboard submarines.  Submarine cruisers used the shorter-barreled 14 cm/40 11th Year Type naval gun.

Naval Use

 single casemate mounts
 20x1  (removed during conversion to hybrid carrier)
 20x1 

 single pedestal mounts
 7x1 
 7x1 
 7x1 
 4x1 
 2x1 light cruiser  (also had twin mounts)
 4x1 aircraft carrier 

 twin mounts
 3x2 seaplane carrier 
 2x2 
 2x2 
 2x2 minelayer 
 2x2 light cruiser  (also had single mounts)

 (uncertain mount)

See also

Weapons of comparable role, performance and era
 BL 5.5 inch Mark I naval gun : British equivalent
 Canon de 138 mm Modèle 1910 Naval gun : French equivalent

Gallery

Notes

References

External links

 14 cm/50 3rd Year Type on navweaps.com

World War II naval weapons
Naval guns of Japan
140 mm artillery